George Morley, (27 February 1598 - 29 October 1684) was a senior member of the Church of England from London, who served as Bishop of Worcester from 1660 to 1662, and of Winchester from 1662 to 1684.

Early life
Morley was born in London, England, in February 1598, to Francis Morley and Sarah Denham, and educated at Westminster School and Christ Church, Oxford.  He graduated BA, 1618, and MA, 1621.  Throughout the 1620s and 1630s he moved in the illustrious intellectual political circles of Lucius Cary, 2nd Viscount Falkland at Great Tew. During these years, he served as domestic chaplain to Robert Dormer, 1st Earl of Carnarvon. In 1640, he was presented to the sinecure living of Hartfield, Sussex, and in the following year he was made canon of Christ Church, Oxford and exchanged Hartfield for the rectory of Mildenhall, Wiltshire.

Civil Wars and Interregnum
He preached before the House of Commons in 1642, but his sermon gave offence, and when in 1647 he took a prominent part in resisting the parliamentary visitation of Oxford University he was deprived of his canonry and living.

Leaving England, he joined the court of Charles II, and became one of the leading clergy at The Hague. Shortly before the Restoration he came to England on a highly successful mission to gain for Charles the support of the Presbyterians. In 1660, he regained his canonry, and soon became Dean of Christ Church. In the same year, he became Bishop of Worcester. He was elected to the See on 9 October, confirmed 23 October, and consecrated a bishop on 28 October. At the Savoy Conference of 1661 he was chief representative of the bishops. He was translated to the See of Winchester in 1662 and made Dean of the Chapel Royal in 1663, a position he held until dismissed by Charles II in 1668.

Works
His works are few and chiefly polemical, e.g. The Bishop of Worcester's to a friend for Vindication of himself from the Calumnies of Mr. Richard Baxter.

References

Sources

|-

1598 births
1684 deaths
Anglican clergy from London
People educated at Westminster School, London
Westminster Divines
Deans of Christ Church, Oxford
Bishops of Worcester
Deans of the Chapel Royal
Bishops of Winchester
17th-century Church of England bishops
Participants in the Savoy Conference
Fellows of the Royal Society
Alumni of Christ Church, Oxford